Susanne Hoeber Rudolph (April 3, 1930 – December 23, 2015) was an American author, political thinker and educationist. She was a William Benton Distinguished Service Professor Emerita at the University of Chicago and was actively interested in Politics, Political Economy and Political Sociology of South Asia, State Formation, Max Weber and the Politics of Category and Culture. The Government of India, in 2014, honored her, along with her husband, Lloyd I. Rudolph, for their services to literature and education, by bestowing on them the third highest civilian award, the Padma Bhushan.

Biography

Susanne Höber was the granddaughter of physiologist Rudolf Höber and daughter of Johannes Höber and Elfriede Fischer Höber, both of whom held doctoral degrees in political science from Heidelberg University. As an activist in Germany's Social Democratic Party, Johannes was imprisoned by the Nazis in 1934 and forced to move from Mannheim, where Susanne was born in 1930, to Düsseldorf. In 1939, when Susanne was nine, the family fled the Nazis and moved to Philadelphia, where Rudolf Höber was a professor at the University of Pennsylvania.

Susanne Rudolph had her early college education at Sarah Lawrence College from where she obtained her BA in 1951 which she followed with an MA from Harvard University in 1953. Continuing her education, she secured her PhD from Radcliffe College in 1955. She taught political science at Harvard University until 1963, when the University of Chicago simultaneously offered her and her husband, Lloyd Rudolph, professorial positions. She joined University of Chicago in 1964 where she worked as the William Benton Distinguished Service Professor Emerita of Political Science.

Susanne was married to Lloyd I. Rudolph, himself a Professor Emeritus of Political Science at the University of Chicago and the co-author of her books. The couple has three children, Jenny, Amelia and Matthew. Susanne, along with her husband, divided their time between the USA and India, where they found a home in Jaipur.

Susanne Rudolph died on December 24, 2015.

Career
Susanne Hoeber Rudolph has served in many capacities of importance during her career.
 President - Association for Asian Studies (1986)
 President - American Political Science Association (2003–2004)
 Master of the Social Science Collegiate Division
 Director of the Center for International Studies
 Director of the South Asia Language and Area Center (1980–1998)
 Chair of the Department of Political Science
 Faculty — Department of Political Science and the College, University of Chicago (1964)
 Associate Professor — Department of Political Science and the College, University of Chicago (1964–72)
 Professor — Department of Political Science and the College, University of Chicago (1972-)
 Associate Dean of the College, University of Chicago (1973–75)
 William Benton Distinguished Service Professor — Department of Political Science and the College, University of Chicago (1990-)
 Professor Emerita — Department of Political Science and the College, University of Chicago (2002-)

Legacy
Susanne and Lloyd Rudolph's associations with the University of Chicago and India have assisted in the University's decision to open a major academic centre in New Delhi. The centre is envisaged to act as a platform for mutual support and collaboration between students and scholars from India and Chicago in the areas of academics and research.

Awards and recognitions
 Padma Bhushan - 2014
 William Benton Distinguished Service Professor Emerita
 India Abroad Friend of India Award -

Works
Susanne Rudolph has authored eight books, together with her husband, Lloyd Rudolph. The writings of Susanne were compiled by Oxford University Press, in 2008, into a three volume publication under the name, Explaining Indian Democracy: A Fifty-Year Perspective.
 

The other major works by Susanne Rudolph are:
 
 
 
 
 
 
 
 

She has also edited the book, Agrarian Power and Agricultural Productivity in South Asia besides writing many articles, some of which are:

See also
 Lloyd Rudolph
 The Rudolphs

Further reading
 Status Conscious
 Making U.S. Foreign Policy Toward South Asia: Regional Imperatives and the Imperial Presidency
 India's Election: Backing into the Future

External links
 India Abroad acceptance speech
 CSDS Golden Jubilee Lecture
 CSDS Golden Jubilee Lecture Introduction
 India Abroad Award and Friends of India Celebration Video
 List of Books on Barnes & Noble
 List of Books on Book Manager

References

1930 births
2015 deaths
Harvard University alumni
Recipients of the Padma Bhushan in literature & education
American women political scientists
American political scientists
American educational theorists
Presidents of the Association for Asian Studies
21st-century American women
Writers from Mannheim
American Indologists
Emigrants from Nazi Germany to the United States